Sitobion leelamaniae, also known as Sitobion (Sitobion) leelamaniae, is an aphid in the superfamily Aphidoidea in the order Hemiptera. It is a true bug and sucks sap from plants.

References 

 http://animaldiversity.org/accounts/Sitobion_leelamaniae/classification/
 http://aphid.speciesfile.org/Common/basic/Taxa.aspx?TaxonNameID=1168831
 http://www.nbair.res.in/Aphids/Sitobion-leelamaniae.php
 http://entoweb.okstate.edu/ddd/insects/englishgrainaphid.htm

Agricultural pest insects
Insects described in 1958
Macrosiphini
Insect pests of millets